The YF-102 is a Chinese liquid rocket engine burning LOX and kerosene in a gas generator cycle. It is manufactured by the AALPT based on the experience of previous kerolox engines, and using 3D printing technology and is capable of multiple restarts. It still does not have a launch vehicle, but in its presentation video, it was shown in a five engine configuration on a 3.35m diameter first stage and as a single engine on the second stage. As of October 2021, it was in an advanced state of development, with six fully assembled prototypes some of which had achieved over 200 seconds of test firing. It was stated that it could be read by 2022. A reusable version, YF-102R  could be ready by 2026 according to the manufacturer.

See also
YF-100 – First stage Chinese rocket engine which is a previous kerolox engine from the manufacturer.
YF-115 – Upper stage Chinese rocket engine which is a previous kerolox engine from the manufacturer.

References

Rocket engines of China
Rocket engines using kerosene propellant
Rocket engines using the expander cycle